John Grey, 2nd Baron Grey of Wilton (died 28 October 1323) was an English nobleman and administrator.

He was the son of Reginald de Grey, 1st Baron Grey de Wilton and his wife Maud de Verdun (or Maud daughter and heir of William Baron FitzHugh). His first office was as vice-justice of Chester from 1296 to 1297.

He participated in the siege and capture of Caerlaverock Castle in July 1300, and his arms were recorded in the Roll of Caerlaverock, a roll of arms compiled during the diese.

He was summoned to Parliament from 1309 to 1322. His first parliamentary appointment was that of Lord Ordainer in 1310, and was followed by the grant in 1311 of Ruthin Castle, which passed to his younger son Roger de Grey. He was at the Battle of Bannockburn, where the English army took a heavy defeat. Nonetheless, he was trusted by Edward II who was confident in the appointment as Justice of North Wales in February 1314/15 and governor of Caernarfon Castle. 

He was relieved of his constabulatory responsibilities the following year and called to raise troops in response to the insurrection led by Llywelyn Bren. He served as conservator of the peace for Bedfordshire in 1320. In 1322, he was commanded to raise troops in Wales and join the royal muster at Coventry.

Family 
Lord de Grey married Anne, daughter of Sir William Ferrers of Groby, Leicestershire although this has never been proven, and leaving:

 Henry de Grey, 3rd Baron Grey of Wilton (28 October 1282 – 10 December 1342)

Secondly, he married Maud, daughter of Ralph Basset and Margaret, daughter of Roger Someri, feudal lord of Dudley. They had:

 Roger de Grey, 1st Baron Grey of Ruthin

Lord de Grey died on 28 October 1323.

Notes

References

Bibliography 
George Edward Cokayne, The Complete Peerage, Vol. II, p. 3; Vol. VI, pp. 151, 173–174.
Burke's Peerage, 1938, p. 1162.
OFHS Newsletter, December 1995, p. 92.
Douglas Richardson, Plantagenet Ancestry, pp. 501, 620, 764–765.
Douglas Richardson, Plantagenet Ancestry: 2nd Edition, Vol. III, pp. 100, 147.
Douglas Richardson, Magna Carta Ancestry, 2nd Edition, Vol. I, p. 241.
Douglas Richardson, Magna Carta Ancestry, 2nd Edition, Vol. II, p. 271.
Douglas Richardson, Magna Carta Ancestry, 2nd Edition, Vol. IV, pp. 22, 341–342.
Douglas Richardson, Royal Ancestry, Vol. I, p. 421.
Douglas Richardson, Royal Ancestry, Vol. III, p. 123.
Douglas Richardson, Royal Ancestry, Vol. IV, p. 94.
Douglas Richardson, Royal Ancestry, Vol. V, pp. 6–7, 367–368.

Year of birth missing
13th-century births
1323 deaths
John de Grey, 2nd Baron Grey de Wilton
Barons Grey de Wilton (1295)